The 1924 Dundee by-election was a by-election held on 22 December 1924 for the British House of Commons constituency of Dundee, in Scotland. It was won by the Labour Party candidate, Thomas Johnston.

Vacancy 
The Labour Party MP E. D. Morel had died on 25 November 1924, aged 51. Morel had held the seat since the 1922 general election, when he had famously defeated Winston Churchill.

Candidates 
The by-election was contested by only two candidates, both of whom were MPs who had been defeated elsewhere at the 1924 general election.

The Labour candidate was 42-year-old Thomas Johnston, who had been MP for Stirling and Clackmannan Western from 1922 to 1924. His only opponent was the Liberal candidate Ernest Simon, an English industrialist who had been MP for Manchester Withington from 1923.

Result 
On a turnout barely half that of the general election in October, Johnston held the seat for Labour, with more than 69% of the vote. He did not contest the seat at the 1929 general election, when he was re-elected for his old constituency of Stirling and Clackmannan Western, and went on to become Secretary of State for Scotland from 1941 to 1945.

Simon was re-elected in 1929 for his old Withington seat, but lost it in 1931, and did not return to the House of Commons. He later joined the Labour Party, and in 1947 he was ennobled and appointed Chairman of the Board of Governors of the BBC.

Votes

See also
Dundee (UK Parliament constituency)
Dundee
List of United Kingdom by-elections (1918–1931)
1908 Dundee by-election
1917 Dundee by-election

Sources 

 

By-elections to the Parliament of the United Kingdom in Scottish constituencies
1924 elections in the United Kingdom
1924 in Scotland
1920s elections in Scotland
20th century in Dundee
By-elections to the Parliament of the United Kingdom in Dundee constituencies
December 1924 events